Coleophora plurispinella is a moth of the family Coleophoridae. It is found in Shandong, eastern China.

The wingspan is about 13 mm.

References

plurispinella
Moths of Asia
Moths described in 1989